Crustumerium (or Crustumium) was an ancient town of Latium, on the edge of the Sabine territory, near the headwaters of the Allia, not far from the Tiber.

In the legends concerning Rome's early history, the Crustumini were amongst the peoples which attended Romulus' festival of Neptune Equester. At that festival, the Roman men seized the young women amongst the visiting spectators, an event known as the Rape of the Sabine Women. Afterwards, according to Livy, the Crustumini commenced hostilities. The Romans retaliated and captured Crustumerium. A Roman colony was subsequently sent to the town by Romulus and many citizens of the town migrated to Rome. More of the Roman colonists preferred to go to Crustumerium than to another town, Antemnae, because of the fertility of the soil at the former.

According to Livy, the town later revolted to become part of the Latin League, which went to war with Rome during the reign of Rome's king Lucius Tarquinius Priscus. Crustumerium was one of a number of towns captured by Tarquinius.

It was conquered in 500 BC according to Livy (ii. 19), the tribus Crustumina or Clustumina being formed in 471 BC.

Livy records that in 468 BC the Sabines marched through the territory of Crustumerium towards Latium, ravaging the countryside.

Pliny mentions it among the lost cities of Latium, but the name clung to the district, the fertility of which remained famous. The site of Crustumerium has been identified in the locality Marcigliana Vecchia, north to modern Rome along the Via Salaria, not far from Settebagni; only partially excavated, it covered an area of some 60 hectares.

Since the site of the city was identified in the 1970s, an archaeological project has been undertaken. In 2010 the Groningen Institute of Archaeology (GIA) received funding of the Netherlands Organization for Scientific Research (NWO) to elaborate their research on the Iron Age settlement of Crustumerium.

References

Sources

8th century BC in the Roman Kingdom
Classical geography
Ancient Italian history